Dipteryx oleifera (syns. Dipteryx panamensis and Coumarouna panamensis), the eboe, choibá or almendro (almond in Spanish), is a species of flowering plant in the family Fabaceae, native to Honduras, Nicaragua, Costa Rica, Panama, Colombia, and Ecuador.

A valuable hardwood timber tree, its almond-flavored seeds are edible and sold in local markets. Its seedpods are so oily that locals use them as torches. It has "great potential" as an ornamental due to its spectacular bloom of pink flowers which lasts for weeks, and is used as a street tree in Medellín, Colombia.

References

oleifera
Non-timber forest products
Flora of Honduras
Flora of Nicaragua
Flora of Costa Rica
Flora of Panama
Flora of Colombia
Flora of Ecuador
Plants described in 1850